Rozhniativ is an urban-type settlement in Kalush Raion, Ivano-Frankivsk Oblast, Ukraine. It hosts the administration of Rozhniativ settlement hromada, one of the hromadas of Ukraine.

Until 18 July 2020, Rozhniativ was the administrative center of Rozhniativ Raion. The raion was abolished in July 2020 as part of the administrative reform of Ukraine, which reduced the number of raions of Ivano-Frankivsk Oblast to six. The area of Rozhniativ Raion was merged into Kalush Raion.

Location 
Local orientation

Regional orientation

References

External links
 Photographs of Jewish sites in Rozhniativ in Jewish History in Galicia and Bukovina
 weather.in.ua 
Rozhniatov Jewish Cemetery fully documented at Jewish Galicia and Bukovina ORG

Urban-type settlements in Kalush Raion
Shtetls